The Ligier Nissan DPi, also known as the Onroak Nissan DPi is a Daytona Prototype car built by Ligier Automotive. The car is based on the Ligier JS P217, which was built to meet the 2017 FIA and ACO regulations for 2017 for the LMP2 category in the FIA World Endurance Championship. The prototype made its racing debut at the 2017 24 Hours of Daytona, with the Tequila Patrón ESM team, finishing 4th on its debut.

Development 
On the 21st of September 2016, it was announced by Scott Sharp, the team owner of Tequila Patrón ESM, that the team would be returning to the IMSA WeatherTech SportsCar Championship full time for 2017, and departing the FIA World Endurance Championship. Simultaneously, it was announced that the team would be renewing its agreement with OAK Racing, and Onroak Automotive, and signing a new multi-year partnership with Nissan Nismo, who would supply the team the VR38DETT 3.8L V6 engine used in the Nissan GT-R GT3. It had been earlier rumored that the team would be running the VRX30A that had been run in the ill-fated Nissan GT-R LM Nismo, which was later refuted by the announcement. The programme would be a non-works supported, customer effort, and it was later revealed that ESM had signed an exclusivity agreement with Nissan for 2 years. The car had its unveiling and shakedown at the Sebring International Raceway in Florida, on the 22nd of December 2016. Between the JS P217 and the DPi, a number of differences were noted, with a large front panel covering the nose area, alongside revised side panels. The final design of the car was also noted to be different from the initial proposals to the Championship governing body, the International Motor Sports Association.

The car was noted to be overweight, compared to its base sibling, the Ligier JS P217, owing to the Nissan VR38DETT engine being over 50 kilograms heavier than the Gibson Technology powerplant utilised in the JS P217.

Racing history

2017 season 
The 2017 season began at the 2017 Rolex 24 At Daytona, with both cars showing strong pace, with the #2 car even leading the race during the rainy night portion of the race, but a number of electrical problems, a penalty as well as a number of spins in the wet saw the team finish just outside the podium, in 4th. At the 2017 BUBBA Burger Sports Car Grand Prix, held at the Long Beach Street Circuit, the team would score its first podium with the car, with the #2 car scoring a 2nd place finish, and the fastest lap of the race. At the 6 Hours of Watkins Glen, Pipo Derani scored the first Pole position for the car. The #22 car would secure the first win for the car at the Continental Tire Road Race Showcase, held at Road America, with the team scoring a 1-3 finish and breaking the 7-race win streak for the Cadillac DPi-V.R. This first win for the car came following a change in the car's electronics from Cosworth to Motec, which had been made in an attempt to increase the reliability of the car. Later, at the season ending Petit Le Mans, the #2 car would benefit from late penalties for the sister #22 car, and the #5 Mustang Sampling Racing cars to win.

2018 season 
The 2018 season started with a double retirement at the 2018 Rolex 24 at Daytona, in spite of the #22 car leading the race for several laps. At the following race, the 12 Hours of Sebring, the team would bounce back, scoring a win, following a strong late-race drive by Pipo Derani. Following the disastrous weekend during the 6 Hours of Watkins Glen, where the team had used 3 engines, and suffered 2 engine failures, the team scaled down its entry to a single car at the Canadian Tire Motorsport Park. Even after the announcement by Patrón that they were to end its involvement in motorsports, Extreme Speed Motorsports had still aimed and intended to continue its participation in the 2019 season with the car. The team later announced it was to relinquish its exclusivity deal with Onroak Automotive, making the car available for purchase with other teams through Onroak. At the America's Tire 250, held at the WeatherTech Raceway Laguna Seca, the car would score its 4th and final win under ESM, and while Derani would score a pole for his final race with the team at the 2018 Petit Le Mans, the team was unable to repeat its win in the previous edition of the race, with the #22 finishing in 6th, while the #2 car would finish 11th. Following the end of the season, ESM would sell both cars to CORE Autosport, before closing its doors.

2019 season 
Due to the withdrawal of title sponsor Patrón Spirits, ESM was forced to shut its doors in November 2018. Subsequently, CORE Autosport announced it would run one car, having acquired both ESM chassis. On 23 August 2019, it was announced by CORE Autosport, that due to the retirement of team owner/driver Jon Bennett, the team would be ceasing its Daytona Prototype International programme, following the season ending 2019 Petit Le Mans, and solely shift its focus on the Porsche factory GT Le Mans Programme. It has also been said that the discontinuation of the programme at CORE Autosport would likely mean an end to racing for the car, as it was known that Nissan had previously shown little interest in supporting the effort.

Results summary

2017 season

Team's Championship (Prototype)

Manufacturer's Championship (Prototype)

2018 season

Team's Championship (Prototype)

Manufacturer's Championship (Prototype)

2019 season

Teams' Championship (Daytona Prototype International)

Manufacturers' Championship (Daytona Prototype International)

References

External links 

 Onroak Automotive

Ligier racing cars
Sports prototypes